Héctor Pesquera is a former Superintendent of the Puerto Rico Police and the Puerto Rico Commissioner of Safety and Public Protection. Pesquera served for 27 years in the Federal Bureau of Investigation (FBI) until his retirement in 2003. He then served as Coordinator for the United States Department of Homeland Security at the Broward County Sheriff's Office from 2003 to 2008, and as Assistant Director of Safety Affairs of the Port of Miami from 2008 to 2012. In 2012, he was named chief of Puerto Rico's police. In an interview with NPR in early 2013, Pesquera stated that Puerto Rico needed more help from the United States in its war against criminals, stating the proverbial "out of sight, out of mind" as it related to how people on the mainland seemed to be out of touch with the issues on the Island. He resigned on November 30, 2013.

References

Federal Bureau of Investigation agents
Federal Bureau of Investigation executives
People from Río Piedras, Puerto Rico
Members of the 15th Cabinet of Puerto Rico
Members of the 16th Cabinet of Puerto Rico
Superintendents of the Puerto Rico Police
Living people
Year of birth missing (living people)